Frederick I (c. 912 – 18 May 978) was the count of Bar and duke of Upper Lorraine. He was a son of Wigeric, count of Bidgau, also count palatine of Lorraine, and Cunigunda, and thus a sixth-generation descendant of Charlemagne.

In 954, he married Beatrice, daughter of Hugh the Great, count of Paris, and Hedwig of Saxony. He received in dowry the revenues of the abbey of Saint-Denis in Lorraine. To stop incursions from the duchy of Champagne, Frederick constructed a castle over the Ornain river in 960, and later occupied confiscated lands of Saint-Mihiel. He exchanged fiefs with the bishop of Toul. Thus, he created his own feudal domain, the county of Bar. So he became the founder of the House of Bar or the House of Ardennes–Bar, a cadet branch of the House of Ardennes.

The duchy of Lorraine was at that time governed by the archbishop of Cologne, Bruno, who was called the archduke on account of his dual title. In 959, Bruno, in concert with his brother, the Emperor Otto I, divided the duchy, appointing as margraves: Godfrey in Lower Lorraine and Frederick in Upper Lorraine. After Bruno's death in 977, Frederick and Godfrey styled themselves dukes.

As duke, Frederick oversaw the reform of Saint-Dié and Moyenmoutier.

Family 

His children were:

 Henry (died between 972 and 978)
 Adalbero II (958–1005), bishop of Verdun and Metz
Theodoric I, Duke of Upper Lorraine (965–1026), count of Bar and duke of Upper Lorraine
 Ida (970–1026), married, in 1010, Radbot, Count of Habsburg (970–1027), who built the castle of Habichtsburg and is thus an ancestor of the great Habsburg family which dominated Europe in the sixteenth century.

Notes

Sources

House of Bar
House of Ardennes

Dukes of Upper Lorraine
910s births
978 deaths
Year of birth uncertain